Leonhard Dientzenhofer (also: Johann Leonhard Dientzenhofer; 20 February 1660 – 26 November 1707) was
a German builder and architect from the well known Dientzenhofer family of architects.

Life and Work

Leonhard was born in St. Margarethen (Bavaria), District of Rosenheim, the seventh child of Georg Dientzenhofer and Anna Thanner. His four brothers, Georg, Wolfgang, Christoph and Johann, were also well-known
architects/builders.  On 30 January 1685 in Waldsassen, he married Maria Anna Hager, a sister of the
wife of his brother Georg.  They had three sons and four daughters. Soon after the death of his
wife Maria (6 July 1699), he married in Bamberg Anna Margaretha Sünder from Staffelstein.  They had two daughters.

In 1697 he commissioned a reprint (with changed dedication and foreword) of the book Theatrum architecturae civilis by Charles Philippe Dieussart.

Leonhard died, aged 47, in Bamberg.  His work on Banz Abbey was taken over by his brother Johann.

Works 

 Bamberg
 work on the Bishops' Residence (1697–1702)
 Kloster Michelsberg: Kloster Building and Facade of the monastery church St. Michael
(1696–1702)
 Curia Sancti Lamperti (Domgasse 8)
 Reconstruction of the Carmelite monastery and church (1692–1707)
 Kloster Banz: (brother Johann also worked on Banz) (1695–1704)
 Kloster Ebrach: (1686)
 Gaibach
 Remodeling of the castle (1694–1704)
 Heilig-Kreuz-Kapelle (1697–1698)   
 Schloss Greifenstein: remodeling in Baroque style (1691–1693)
 Hollfeld: Salvatorkirche (1704)
 Kulmbach: Langheimer Amtshof (1691)
 Kloster Langheim: overall plan (beginning 1690)
 Tambach: Schloss Tambach (1694–1700)
 Schöntal im Jagsttal: Cloister building and church (1694–1707)
 Trautmannshofen: Plan for the pilgrimage church Mariä Namen (construction Georg Dientzenhofer, after the death of Wolfgang Dientzenhofer) (1686)

Literature 
 Milada Vilímková, Johannes Brucker: Dientzenhofer. Eine bayerische Baumeisterfamilie in der Barockzeit. Rosenheimer Verlagshaus, 1989, 
 Hans Zimmer: Die Dientzenhofer. Ein bayerisches Baumeistergeschlecht in der Zeit des Barock. Rosenheim 1976, 
 Allgemeine Deutsche Biographie, Bd. 3, S. 651
 Reclams Kunstführer Bayern,

External links 
 Initials of Leonhard Dientzenhofer on Haus zum Güldenen Stern, Bamberg
 http://www.mgl-obermaingeschichte.de/barock/SeitenBanz/Dientzenhofer.htm

Notes

1660 births
1707 deaths
17th-century German architects
People from Rosenheim (district)
German Baroque architects
Bavarian architects